Salmenkallio (Finnish), Sundberg (Swedish) is a subdistrict of Helsinki, Finland.

Neighbourhoods of Helsinki